An industrial show may refer to:
 Trade shows organized by one or more businesses to promote their products to potential buyers
 Industrial musicals performed for company employees for motivational purposes